Thaumatothrips is a genus of thrips in the family Phlaeothripidae.

Species
 Thaumatothrips froggatti

References

Phlaeothripidae
Thrips
Thrips genera